Elizabeth Koleva (born 11 November 1972 in Sofia) is a Bulgarian individual rhythmic gymnast.

Biography
Elizabeth Koleva was born in the city of Sofia. Elizabeth began her sports career and gymnastics at club Slavia. She was one of the Golden Girls of Bulgaria that dominated Rhythmic Gymnastics in the 1980s.

Koleva had good results as a junior, At the 1987 European Junior Championships she won the All-around title, as well as the gold medal in all four apparatus (rope, hoop, ball, ribbon) and achieved a maximum score of 40.00 points. She advanced to Senior the following year and at the 1987 World Championships Koleva tied with teammate Adriana Dunavska for the silver medal in the all-around, she also won a bronze medal at the Ribbon finals.

In 1988, Koleva tied with teammate Dunavska and Soviet gymnast Alexandra Timoshenko for the gold at the European Championships, where she was also won a gold medal in rope and bronze in clubs final.

Koleva retired early at only 16 years old. She later became a coach at her home club Slavia. She married Bulgarian national volleyball and later national coach of the men's volleyball team Martin Stoev. Koleva now lives in Italy with her husband and two children ( Marina and Eric ).

References

External links
 
 http://sporta.bg/?load=OtherSports::Champion&id=261 ( Golden Girls of Bulgaria )

1972 births
Bulgarian rhythmic gymnasts
Living people
Bulgarian emigrants to Italy
Medalists at the Rhythmic Gymnastics World Championships